"There Stands the Glass" is a country song written by Russ Hull, Mary Jean Shurtz, and Autry Greisham. Originally recorded by Blaine Smith in 1952, it was a hit for Webb Pierce in 1953. It was Pierce's fifth release to hit number one on the country chart. It spent 27 weeks on the chart and was at the top for 12 weeks.

Bob Dylan commented that "The star of this song is the empty bourbon glass, and it's built around the same kind of crack guitar sound as on a Hank Williams record, as well as the magical open-string, strummed chord."

Cover versions
The song appears on the Carl Smith album, There Stands the Glass, released in 1964.
Scott McKenzie released a version of the song as a single in 1965.
Wanda Jackson covered this song on her 1968 album Cream of the Crop.
Jerry Lee Lewis recorded the song in 1969.
In 1973, singer Johnny Bush peaked at number 34 on the US country chart and number 60 on the Canadian country chart with his version of the song.
Loretta Lynn recorded the song in 1981 on her I Lie LP.
Hoyt Axton covered the song in 1982.
Ted Hawkins covered the song on his 1986 album On the Boardwalk, and in 1994 on his final recording, The Next Hundred Years. 
Jon Spencer Blues Explosion covered the song on the 1994 Mo' Width LP.
Robert Gordon covered the song on his 1996 album The Humbler.
Van Morrison recorded the song in 2006 on his Pay the Devil CD.
Half Man Half Biscuit covered it in a 2002 Andy Kershaw session.
Patty Loveless included her cover of the song in her 2008 Sleepless Nights album.
Billy Childish and CTMF released the song as a single in 2013.
The song is sampled in Sam Hunt's 2020 song "Hard to Forget".

References

1952 songs
1953 singles
1965 singles
1973 singles
Webb Pierce songs
Carl Smith (musician) songs
Scott McKenzie songs
Johnny Bush songs
Jerry Lee Lewis songs
Loretta Lynn songs
George Jones songs
Hoyt Axton songs
Van Morrison songs
Half Man Half Biscuit songs
Capitol Records singles
Decca Records singles
Song recordings produced by Owen Bradley